The Three Fires Council of the Boy Scouts of America is located in Illinois. In 1992, it was formed from the merger of Two Rivers Council and DuPage Area Council (named for Dupage County); it was briefly called "Two Rivers-DuPage Area Council". Its council service center is located in St. Charles, Illinois. 

Council volunteers and residents who have received national honors include Richard H. Leet, Samuel K. Skinner, J. Dennis Hastert and Kenneth P. King, all of whom received the Silver Buffalo Award. 

Three Fires operates Camp Big Timber near Elgin, Illinois and Scout Shops in St. Charles, Illinois and Naperville, Illinois. The council is divided into 3 districts based on location.

Organization
 Chippewa District 1
 Ottawa District 2
 Potawatomi District 3

Camp Freeland Leslie

The Three Fires Council owned and operated Camp Freeland Leslie (CFL) near Oxford, Wisconsin, from 1972 to 2021. It was located approximately 25 miles northeast of the Wisconsin Dells. The camp offered over 500 acres of natural settings: oak forests, prairies, swamp, streams, abundant wildlife and a lake entirely on the property. The camp was purchased by the former DuPage Area Council in 1970. Camp Freeland Leslie was first used as a summer camp in 1972. Camp Freeland Leslie was a patrol cooking camp, and did not operate a dining hall.

In March of 2021, the Three Fires Council announced that Camp Freeland Leslie would be sold and that the 2021 summer would be the last summer camp season. The camp was sold in part due to the Boy Scouts of America's bankruptcy filing and the necessity for the council to contribute to the sex abuse victim's trust fund.

Lowaneu Allanque Lodge
Lowaneu Allanque Lodge is the Order of the Arrow Lodge affiliated with Three Fires Council. The Spring Fellowship was held at CFL, as well as Ordeal and Brotherhood ceremonies during summer camp. Many Three Fires Council Order of the Arrow events take place at Camp Freeland Leslie.

See also
 Scouting in Illinois

References

External links
 Three Fires Council Web Site
 Freeland Leslie
 Lowaneu Allanque

Local councils of the Boy Scouts of America
Central Region (Boy Scouts of America)
Youth organizations based in Illinois